SPFC may refer to:

 São Paulo Futebol Clube a Brazilian football team
 Semen Padang F.C., an Indonesian association football team
 South Park F.C. an English football team